Cytisine, also known as baptitoxine, cytisinicline, or sophorine, is an alkaloid that occurs naturally in several plant genera, such as Laburnum and Cytisus of the family Fabaceae. It has been used medically to help with smoking cessation.  Although widely used for smoking cessation in Eastern Europe, cytisine remains relatively unknown beyond it. However, it has been found effective in several randomized clinical trials, including some in the United States and a large one in New Zealand, and is being investigated in additional trials in the United States (being conducted by Achieve Life Sciences) and a non-inferiority trial in Australia in which it is being compared head-to-head with the smoking cessation aid varenicline (sold in the United States as Chantix). It has also been used entheogenically via mescalbeans by some Native American groups, historically in the Rio Grande Valley predating even peyote.

Sources 

Cytisine is extracted from the seeds of Cytisus laborinum L. (Golden Rain acacia), and is found in several genera of the subfamily Faboideae of the family Fabaceae, including Laburnum, Anagyris, Thermopsis, Cytisus, Genista, Retama and Sophora.  Cytisine is also present in Gymnocladus of the subfamily Caesalpinioideae.

Uses

Smoking cessation
Cytisine has been available in post-Soviet states for more than 40 years as an aid to smoking cessation under the brand name Tabex from the Bulgarian pharmaceutical company Sopharma AD. It was first marketed in Bulgaria in 1964 and then became widely available in the then-Soviet Union. In Poland, it is sold under the brand name Desmoxan, and it is also available in Canada under the brand name Cravv.

Its molecular structure has some similarity to that of nicotine, and it has similar pharmacological effects. Like the smoking cessation aid varenicline, cytisine is a partial agonist of nicotinic acetylcholine receptors (nAChRs). Cytisine has a short half-life of 4.8 hours. As a result, the extract provides smokers with satisfaction similar to smoking a cigarette, alleviating the urge to smoke and reducing the severity of nicotine withdrawal symptoms, while also reducing the reward experience of any cigarettes smoked.

Cytisine is rapidly eliminated from the body.

In 2011, a randomized controlled trial with 740 patients found cytisine improved 12-month abstinence from nicotine from 2.4% with placebo to 8.4% with cytisine. A 2013 meta-analysis of eight studies demonstrated that cytisine has similar effectiveness to varenicline but with substantially lower side effects. A 2014 systematic review and economic evaluation concluded that cytisine was more likely to be cost-effective for smoking cessation than varenicline.

Recreational
Plants containing cytisine, including the scotch broom and mescalbean, have also been used recreationally. Positive effects are reported to include a nicotine-like intoxication.

Reagent for organic chemistry
(−)-Cytisine extracted from Laburnum anagyroides seeds was used as a starting material for the preparation of "(+)-sparteine surrogate," for the preparation of enantiomerically enriched lithium anions of opposite stereochemistry to those anions obtained from sparteine.

Toxicity
Cytisine has been found to interfere with breathing and cause death in test mice. ;  i.v., in mice is about 2 mg/kg.   Cytisine is also teratogenic.

Māmane (Sophora chrysophylla) can contain amounts of cytisine that are lethal to most animals. The palila (Loxioides bailleui, a bird), Uresiphita polygonalis virescens and Cydia species (moths), and possibly sheep and goats are not affected by the toxin for various reasons, and use māmane, or parts thereof, as food. U. p. virescens caterpillars are possibly able to sequester the cytisine to give themselves protection from getting eaten; they have aposematic coloration which would warn off potential predators.

References

External links

 

Nicotinic agonists
Alkaloids found in Fabaceae
Lactams
Bridged heterocyclic compounds
Teratogens
Plant toxins
Nitrogen heterocycles
Quinolizidine alkaloids